is a district located in western Kushiro Subprefecture, Hokkaido, Japan.

Towns 
Shiranuka

Merger 
On October 11, 2005, the town of Onbetsu, along with the town of Akan (from Akan District), merged into the expanded city of Kushiro.

Districts in Hokkaido